The Pandava Caves are located near Kadri Manjunath temple in Mangalore, Karnataka, India. Historians found that the current temple was a Buddhist monastery known as Kandarika Vihara. The shrine had a standing Buddha image in it. This image was replaced by the King Kundvarma of the Alupa dynasty, who was a devotee of Shiva. However it was not the Buddha but a bodhisattva who was historically integrated with Shiva. Historians concluded that the vihara was originally a centre of the cult of the bodhisattva Manjusri. This temple was one of the famous centres of learning and pilgrimage until the 11th century CE. This particular doctrine opened the doors for Tantric religion. Both Shilinga and the bodhisattva were worshipped for many centuries until the Buddhist temple was converted to a purely Saivite temple.

According to the mythological sources, Pandavas stayed here during their exile in the Mahabharata period.

References 

Caves of Karnataka
History of Mangalore
Buddhist monasteries in India
Buddhist caves in India
Indian rock-cut architecture
Former populated places in India
Buddhist pilgrimage sites in India
Buddhist temples in India
Architecture in India
Buddhist sites in Karnataka
Buildings and structures in Mangalore
Geography of Mangalore